The Yorkshire Grey is a public house on the corner of Langham Street and Middleton Place in Fitzrovia/East Marylebone, City of Westminster, London W1.

History
The Yorkshire Grey dates back to at least 1826. It was rebuilt in 1882–83 to designs by the architect George Treacher.

The author and playwright J. B. Priestley was a regular visitor during the Second World War when he did his inspirational talks on BBC radio from the nearby Broadcasting House. The bandleader Billy Cotton was a frequent customer, as his radio programme was also broadcast from there.

Gallery

References

External links

Pubs in the City of Westminster